Apostolic may refer to:

The Apostles
An Apostle meaning one sent on a mission:
The Twelve Apostles of Jesus, or something related to them, such as the Church of the Holy Apostles
Apostolic succession, the doctrine connecting the Christian Church to the original Twelve Apostles
The Apostolic Fathers, the earliest generation of post-Biblical Christian writers
The Apostolic Age, the period of Christian history when Jesus' apostles were living
The Apostolic Constitutions, part of the Ante-Nicene Fathers collection

Specific to the Roman Catholic Church
Apostolic Administrator, appointed by the Pope to an apostolic administration or a diocese without a bishop
Apostolic Camera, or "Apostolic Chamber", former department of finance for Papal administration
Apostolic constitution, a public decree issued by the Pope
Apostolic Palace, the residence of the Pope in Vatican City
Apostolic prefect, the head of a mission of the Roman Catholic Church
The Apostolic See, sometimes used to refer to the See of Rome; see 
Apostolic vicariate, a territorial jurisdiction of the Roman Catholic Church
Chancery of Apostolic Briefs, a historical office charged with preparation of Papal correspondence

National churches
Church of Our Lord Jesus Christ of the Apostolic Faith, an apostolic organization based in the United States
Apostolic Catholic Church (Philippines), a church based in the Philippines
Armenian Apostolic Church, also known as the Armenian Orthodox Church, the national church of Armenia
Apostolic Brethren, a 13th-century sect in northern Italy
The Apostolic Church Nigeria, a Lagos-based Pentecostal Christian denomination in Nigeria, affiliated with the Apostolic Church
Assyrian Church of the East, ancient Christian religious body from Assyria

Christian denominations
Apostolic Christian Church, an anabaptist branch of Christianity
Laestadianism, or Apostolic Lutheranism, a pietistic Lutheran movement 
Apostolic Pastoral Congress, an organization consisting of Pentecostal bishops, pastors and other clergy, functioning as a collegiate collective, and founded during the first decade of the 21st century
Catholic Apostolic Church, a millenarian religious community, related to the Irvingism movement
Celtic Orthodox Church, also known as the Catholic Apostolic Church (Catholicate of the West), a name adopted in the 1940s by a movement to restore ancient Christianity in Britain and the West
Christ Apostolic Church, an indigenous African church
New Apostolic Church, a chiliastic (premillenarian) church
Oneness Pentecostalism, also known as Apostolic Pentecostalism, a form of Pentecostal Christianity that is non-trinitarian in theology

Concepts
An apostolic see, any episcopal see whose foundation is attributed to one or more of the Apostles
Apostolic poverty, a doctrine professed in the 13th century by certain religious orders
Apostolic King, hereditary title of the King of Hungary

See also 
Apostle (disambiguation)
Apostolic Church (disambiguation)
Catholic Apostolic Church (disambiguation)
Apostol (disambiguation)